Alfadolone (INN), or alphadolone is a neuroactive steroid and general anesthetic. Along with alfaxolone, as alfadolone acetate, it is one of the components of the anesthetic drug mixture althesin.

Chemistry

See also
 Ganaxolone
 Hydroxydione
 Minaxolone
 Pregnanolone
 Renanolone

References

General anesthetics
Neurosteroids
GABAA receptor positive allosteric modulators
Pregnanes